Events in the year 1881 in India.

Incumbents
 Empress of India – Queen Victoria
 Viceroy of India – George Robinson, 1st Marquess of Ripon
The Tribune - started in 1881

Events
 National income - 4,088 million
 The 7.9  Nicobar Islands earthquake shook the area with a maximum EMS-98 intensity of VII (Damaging). It is probably the earliest earthquake for which rupture parameters were estimated instrumentally.
First commercial bank of India was established (Oudh Commercial Bank). Having an entirely Indian board of directors. In Faizabad, India
Setakaryancha Asuda(the whip-cord of the peasantry)

Law
 Negotiable Instruments Act
Obstructions In Fairways Act
Judicial Committee Act (British statute)
India Office (Sale Of Superfluous Land) Act (British statute)
East Indian Railway (Redemption Of Annuities) Act (British statute)
Army Act (British statute)
Fugitive Offenders Act (British statute)

Births
 November – Darwan Singh Negi, recipient of the Victoria Cross for gallantry in 1914 (d.1950).
Varahaneri Venkatesa Subramaniam Aiyar, also known as V. V. S. Aiyar, was an Indian revolutionary from Tamil Nadu who fought against British colonial rule in India_2 April 1881.

References

 
India
Years of the 19th century in India